The War Eagle Creek Bridge is a historic bridge in northern Madison County, Arkansas. It carries County Road 1650 across War Eagle Creek northeast of Huntsville, and just north of creek crossing of United States Route 412. Each arch spans , and they are mounted on concrete abutments and a central pier. Built in 1925–26, it is the county's only known surviving example of this bridge type.

The bridge was listed on the National Register of Historic Places in 2008.

See also
National Register of Historic Places listings in Madison County, Arkansas
List of bridges on the National Register of Historic Places in Arkansas

References

Road bridges on the National Register of Historic Places in Arkansas
Bridges completed in 1925
National Register of Historic Places in Madison County, Arkansas
Concrete bridges in the United States
Open-spandrel deck arch bridges in the United States
1925 establishments in Arkansas
Transportation in Madison County, Arkansas